The 2021 Wokingham Borough Council election took place on 6 May 2021 to elect members of Wokingham Borough Council in England. This was on the same day as other local elections and had been postponed from May 2020, due to the COVID-19 pandemic.

The composition of the council before the election was as follows:

There was one vacancy.

After the election, the composition of the council became:

Election result
The Conservatives retained control of the council and gained one seat from Labour. They regained a seat from an Independent who had originally been elected as a Conservative, and also regained a vacant seat, which had been won by a Conservative in 2016, who joined the Liberal Democrats in 2017, and had resigned from the Council in 2020. The Liberal Democrats gained three seats from the Conservatives.

Total Election result

A total of 46,771 votes were cast for 62 candidates. (46,445 unspoilt)

Ward results

22 ballot papers were rejected

9 ballot papers were rejected

26 ballot papers were rejected

17 ballot papers were rejected

17 ballot papers were rejected

13 ballot papers were rejected

13 ballot papers were rejected

15 ballot papers were rejected

3 ballot papers were rejected.

16 ballot papers were rejected

29 ballot papers were rejected

23 ballot papers were rejected

12 ballot papers were rejected.

19 ballot papers were rejected

17 ballot papers were rejected

28 ballot papers were rejected

25 ballot papers were rejected

12 ballot papers were rejected

References

Wokingham
Wokingham Borough Council elections